Larry Cleo Morris (December 10, 1933 – December 19, 2012) was an American professional football player who was a linebacker in the National Football League (NFL), primarily with the Chicago Bears. The 1950 graduate of Decatur High School became an All-American playing college football for the Georgia Tech Yellow Jackets before his NFL career. "The Brahma Bull" was named one of the linebackers on the NFL 1960s All-Decade Team. He was sentenced to probation for his role in the Savings and loan crisis.

College career
Morris was a four-year starter and a two-way player at center and linebacker positions for the Georgia Tech Yellow Jackets. Morris was also selected as three times first-team All-SEC and a team captain as a senior. He played during coach Bobby Dodd's most successful seasons at Georgia Tech. The Yellow Jackets had a 40-5-2 record over Morris’ four seasons, won two SEC titles, four bowl games and a share of the 1952 national championship with a 12–0 record. In his final game as a Yellow Jacket against rival Georgia in Athens on November 27, 1954, he played the entire game and was credited with 24 tackles as his team won 7–3. He was later named to the All-SEC 25-year team spanning 1950–1974 and in 1992 was inducted into the College Football Hall of Fame, one of 12 Tech players there.

Professional career
Morris was the seventh overall pick of the 1955 NFL draft. He was named one of the linebackers on the NFL 1960s All-Decade Team. Morris played 12 seasons total with the Los Angeles Rams, Chicago Bears, and Atlanta Falcons. He was the MVP of the 1963 NFL Championship Game for the Bears. In addition, he was a member of the Atlanta Falcons' first-team in 1966.

Savings & Loan crisis conviction
Morris was indicted and received probation during the Savings and loan crisis. As a licensed Atlanta real estate agent, two top corporate executives of First Mutual Savings in Pensacola, Florida, took illegal kickbacks causing his condos and rehabs loans to go bad.

Health concerns
Morris was featured in an article in The Sporting News about former football players who had head injuries that happened during their career.  According to the article, Morris had little, if any, recollection of his playing days.

Death
Larry Cleo Morris died on December 19, 2012. A native Atlantan, he spent his last few years, since 2009, under nursing home care, at Presbyterian Village, in the city of Austell, Georgia. His brain was donated by his family to Boston University for the study of brain injuries associated with former professional football players.

See also
 1952 college football season
 Mike Ditka

References

External links
Larry Morris statistics

1933 births
2012 deaths
People from Austell, Georgia
Sportspeople from Cobb County, Georgia
Players of American football from Georgia (U.S. state)
Georgia Tech Yellow Jackets football players
All-American college football players
American football players with chronic traumatic encephalopathy
College Football Hall of Fame inductees
Los Angeles Rams players
Atlanta Falcons players
Chicago Bears players
Deaths from dementia in Georgia (U.S. state)